FMEA is an initialism for failure mode and effects analysis.

FMEA may also refer to:
Florida Municipal Electric Association
Florida Music Education Association